Walnut is an extinct town in Lumpkin County, in the U.S. state of Georgia.

History
A post office called Walnut was established in 1892, and remained in operation until 1933. The community was named for the walnut trees native to the area.

References

Geography of Lumpkin County, Georgia
Ghost towns in Georgia (U.S. state)